Sybra strigina is a species of beetle in the family Cerambycidae. It was described by Pascoe in 1865. It is known from Moluccas.

References

strigina
Beetles described in 1865